FutureMedia is a collaborative initiative at Georgia Tech and the Georgia Tech Research Institute to analyze the state and future of digital, social, and mobile media. Georgia Tech has around 500 faculty members working in those fields.

FutureMedia Fest
The organization most recently hosted FutureMedia Fest 2010, a four-day conference (Oct 4–7, 2010) with a keynote addresses from Michael Jones, the chief technology advocate at Google. The event featured panels, workshops, and technology demonstrations.

FutureMedia Outlook
Contemporaneous with FutureMedia Fest 2010, the organization released the FutureMedia Outlook, an analysis of the future of media, concentrating on six major trends in those fields, including information overload, personalization, data integrity, an expectation of multimedia, augmented reality, and collaborative software.

References

External links
 Official website
 Twitter account

Georgia Tech Research Institute
Mass media monitoring
Social media
Digital media